Khoka 420 is a Bengali romantic action comedy film directed by Rajib Biswas. The film stars Dev, Subhashree Ganguly, Nusrat Jahan, Tapas Paul, Rajatava Dutta and others. The film is a remake of the 2010 Telugu film Brindavanam starring N. T. Rama Rao Jr., Samantha Ruth Prabhu and Kajal Agarwal. The film was dubbed into Hindi as "Mere Ustas 420".

Plot 
In this story Krish (played by Dev) is the hero and Bhoomi (played by Subhashree Ganguly) is the leading heroine. Krish is the son of a rich man. Krish (has love interest in Megha (Nusrat Jahan). Megha also loves Krish a.k.a. Krishna. Their relationship goes fine until Megha meets Bhoomi (Subhashree Ganguly), and they become best friends. Bhoomi tells her best friend Megha about his rowdy and tough cousin who her family wants her to marry, but she does not want to. Megha gets worried about her friend and tells the problem to her boyfriend, Krish. Megha makes Bhoomi meet Krish and tells Krish to act as if Krish is Bhoomi's boyfriend and let Bhoomi's family know that Bhoomi is in a relationship with Krish. Krish does not agree at first but later agrees to help out Bhoomi. In the meantime, Bhoomi fall in love with Krish in reality. Krish also gets close to Bhoomi. Later, one day Krish gets to know that Megha and Bhoomi's fathers are step-brothers and they have a family rivalry between them from ages. Krish meets the two brothers' father (Haradhan Bandopadhyay) and gets to know why they have the rivalry and also gets to know that grandfather wants them to be together again. The grandfather gives the responsibility to Krish to get the two families together again and if he is successful he will get the hand in marriage of Megha or Bhoomi – whomever he is in love with. Krish falls in a big problem as he is not interested in all this family rivalry. But later he decides to get the family together. In the meantime, Megha gets the wrong idea that Krish and Bhoomi are cheating her and Krish is in love with Bhoomi and not her. Due to the untimely death of Late Shri Haradhan Bandopadhay, the climax of the movie was changed which made it different from the original story of Brindavanam where Krish marries Bhoomi as Megha explained.

Cast 
 Dev as Krish
 Subhashree Ganguly as Bhoomi
 Nusrat Jahan as Megha
 Tapas Paul as Bhoomi's father (Brojeshwar Ganguly)
 Rajatava Dutta as Megha's father (Mohanlal Ganguly)
 Haradhan Bandopadhyay as The grandfather of Bhoomi and Megha
 Partho Sarathi Chakraborty as Hari
 Shubhajit Bhowmik as Krish's companion
 Supriyo Dutta as Krish's fake father
 Laboni Sarkar as Krish's mother
 Kunal Padhy as Krish's father
 Anjan Mahato as Krish's driver (Kamol Bhai)
 Joy Badlani as Biju, Hari's father
 Pradip Dhar as Joy, Bhoomi's uncle
 Madhumita Chatterjee as Megha's mother

Soundtrack 

The album is scored by Savvy.

Series 
 Khokababu
 Khoka 420

References

External links 

Bengali-language Indian films
2010s Bengali-language films
Bengali remakes of Telugu films
Films scored by Savvy Gupta
Films directed by Rajiv Kumar Biswas
Films scored by Shree Pritam
Films scored by Rishi Chanda